The West River is a  tidal tributary of Chesapeake Bay in southern Anne Arundel County, Maryland. It is south of the Rhode River, which is one of its tributaries, and north of Herring Bay.

These are its named tidal creeks and rivers starting at the southern edge of its mouth and going clockwise:

Parish Creek
Lafayette Creek (unofficial name)
South Creek
Upper West River/Fords Creek (latter is an unofficial name)
Johns Creek
Smith Creek
Lerch Creek
Tenthouse Creek & Cox Creek (Cox is a tributary of Tenthouse)
Popham Creek
Scaffold Creek
Cheston Creek
Rhode River

See also
List of Maryland rivers

References

External links
West/Rhode Riverkeeper web site
Maryland DNR Surf your watershed, Rhode & West

Rivers of Anne Arundel County, Maryland
Tributaries of the Chesapeake Bay
Rivers of Maryland